Fox Hollow may refer to:

Fox Hollow, Indiana
Fox Hollow (Oregon County, Missouri)
Fox Hollow (Rensselaer County, New York)
Fox Hollow (Mehoopany Creek), a stream in Wyoming County, Pennsylvania
Fox Hollow, Virginia
Foxhollow, Wisconsin
Fox Hollow School, Lenox, Massachusetts